Cue Club 2 is a sports simulation video game developed by Bulldog Interactive. First released for Microsoft Windows on 4 July 2014, it is a realistic interpretation of pool and snooker, and is the sequel to Cue Club. The game has received continual updates since launch, including an  online multiplayer mode, the addition of a first-person camera with 3-dimensional (3D) tables and bars, a wide selection of larger table sizes, and an expanded range of achievements.

Gameplay

Cue Club 2 can be played in either top-down view (2D mode) or a first-person view (3D mode). Game control options include mouse and keyboard, game-pad or touchscreen device. Several game types are available including eight-ball (including both US and European Blackball rules), nine-ball, ten-ball, six-ball, seven-ball, snooker, speed pool, and killer. The rules of eight-ball, ten-ball and killer can be customised to reflect many variants in use around the world. There are three variations of snooker: a full game with fifteen reds, and shorter games with either ten or six reds. Players choose from a selection of game modes including Practice, Single Player Quick Game, 2-4 Player, Tournament, Bar Challenge and an online Multiplayer mode.

The game is set in a fictional club featuring a range of themed bars and theatre venues, and each is host to a selection of unique opponents of varying difficulty. Upon starting the game for the first time the player is required to sign in by entering their name, after which they are given a membership card to access the Basement Bar.

There are two main parts to the game. The first is to complete the Bar Challenge, where the player chooses the game rules in each match and aims to progress through the stages by beating computer-controlled opponents one by one. There are fifteen characters in total, complete with imagery, and dressed in casual clothing. After defeating all the opponents in a bar, the player is awarded a membership card to the next bar where the difficulty level increases. When all the bars have been unlocked and the opponents defeated, the player is presented with the Bar Challenge trophy.
 

The second part to Cue Club 2 is the tournament mode. Sixteen players compete in a tournament, and for this game mode opponents are dressed in formal competition attire. Progress is initially straightforward, but gets harder as weaker players are eliminated and more skilful opponents are encountered. There are four rounds in total (first round, quarter-final, semi-final and final), and the number of frames played can be set anywhere from Best of 3 up to Best of 35. Since matches can potentially take a long time to complete, games may be saved at any point and resumed later using one of the numerous save-game slots. If the player succeeds in winning a tournament they are awarded a trophy, with trophies for each of the nine variations of pool and snooker available.

Other accolades can be gained for achieving high snooker breaks, including a century break and the elusive 147 maximum. Additional trophies are awarded for fast clearance times in speed pool, and also for accumulating points in multiplayer earned by winning matches. In total there are sixty-two trophies to collect, which includes individual colour-coded Bar Challenge and tournament trophies for each of the five difficulty settings.

The game is officially completed when all of the above trophies have been earned, filling the slots on the Summary of Achievements table. Upon successful completion of the Bar Challenge, which is arguably the largest and most challenging aspect of the game, a victory sequence is played.

New features

Cue Club 2 expands on the original game with new artwork and additional character designs. There is a large range of cues and ball sets to choose from, which can be modified to alter their appearance and performance. The table cloth, pockets and rails can also be customized, along with the speed of the cloth and cushions. The method of cueing may also be adjusted. Additionally, players are able to choose from a selection of coloured chalk. The developers state that the physics engine has been fully overhauled and the A.I. of the computer opponents significantly improved to play in a more natural and realistic way.

Players can save shots and replay them at a variety of speeds and camera angles, and also save and replay their highest snooker breaks and speed pool clearance times. Matches can also be saved mid-game and resumed later, allowing for tournaments and other long games to be completed in multiple sittings. As a bonus, two fun games have been added, including a revised Slam mode, where balls can be swung around on a length of cord, and a Detonator mode where the balls explode on impact (this mode was formerly a "cheat" option in the original Cue Club). A selection of nine new soundtracks were composed for the title, serving as background music to complement gameplay.

In an attempt to stay true to its roots the developers retained recognizable styling elements from the first game, but made several key technical improvements to enable support for widescreen, ultra widescreen, and touchscreen monitors, in addition to 1080p High Definition graphics and 4K displays. The software can support multiple resolutions and aspect ratios, to ensure there is no stretching or image distortion. Full screen anti-aliasing is also supported, as well as multiple refresh rates ranging from 60 Hz up to 240 Hz.

Online multiplayer
In September 2016, the developers added an online multiplayer feature with customisable game rules, allowing players to compete over the Internet. Winning matches increases the player's score, and when sufficient points have been gained the multiplayer trophies are awarded, of which there are three in total. The online mode also incorporates an in-game text chat facility.

3D camera
In June 2017, a first-person camera view was added to the game, along with 3D tables and bars. Players can quickly switch between top-down and first-person mode, which leads to a more realistic playing experience whilst still offering a full view of the table. The various themed bars are also represented in 3D (Cue Club, Basement, Cocktail and Penthouse), with an option to customize the look of the Cue Club bar. In later updates a 'TV' style static camera view was added for watching your opponent and also for replays.

Larger table sizes
In April 2018, a selection of bigger tables were introduced, including 6, 7, 8 and 9ft pool tables, along with 8, 9, 10, 11 and full size 12ft snooker tables. Whilst the larger tables would be more challenging to play on, the developers were keen to further increase the realism of the simulation and provide more configurable options for the players, in both competitive matches and practice mode.

New venues
In February 2019, four new theatre venues were added: Cue Club, Basement, Cocktail and Penthouse theatres. These venues feature an interactive and lively audience who respond to good shots with cheering and applause, and sigh when fouls are committed. Theatres are used to host tournament matches, and can also be selected for quick matches, multiplayer and practice play.

Alternative control system
In June 2020, a new control system was introduced for mouse and keyboard, and also game controllers. The method, called 'fast aiming' allows the player to set up shots more easily and without the need to press and hold buttons to adjust the aiming target. The previous control method was preserved for players who prefer to use the original system, with an option provided in the menus. In January 2021, the developers went on to add automatic ball nomination in both pool and snooker. The system utilises the aiming line and target to quickly nominate balls, speeding up gameplay.

Table wear
In September 2020, cloth wear was added as a selectable menu option. There are four levels available, which introduce chalk marks, burn marks and general wear and tear in progressively increasing amounts, which also affects the speed of the table. Players are still able to select a new table cloth, which is the default option.

Extra trophies
In November 2020, a range of new colour-coded trophies were introduced for each of the five difficulty settings of tournament and Bar Challenge modes. In August 2022, bronze, silver and gold awards were added to multiplayer for gaining 1,000, 5,000 and 10,000 points respectively, bringing the total number of collectable trophies up to sixty-two.

Critical response
In November 2015, gaming website MouseNJoypad.com awarded Cue Club 2 a score of 81%, recommending the game over any other pool simulator currently on the market.

References

External links 
 

Windows games
Windows-only games
Cue sports video games
Snooker video games
2014 video games
Video games developed in the United Kingdom
Video game sequels
Multiplayer and single-player video games